YoungBloodZ is an American Southern hip hop duo from Atlanta, Georgia composed of J-Bo (born Jeffrey Raymond Grigsby on October 4, 1977) and Sean P (born Sean Paul Ryan Joseph on March 7, 1979). The duo was signed to LaFace Records. They are one of many commercially successful Atlanta hip hop artists.

Career 
Jeffrey Raymond Grigsby and Sean Paul Ryan Joseph met at Decatur's Miller Grove Middle School, where they started the Attic Crew with some friends.

Their debut album was Against Da Grain, released in 1999 on LaFace. The duo are best known for singles like "U-Way" (1999) and "85" (2000), which featured Big Boi. After a 3-year absence, they returned with Cadillac Pimpin''' in 2003, scoring a moderate hit. The duo's sophomore effort featured Grammy-nominated single "Damn!", reaching No. 4 on the Billboard Hot 100 and becoming their only top 10 hit. It was produced by Lil Jon.

YoungBloodz released Ev'rybody Know Me in 2005. It featured guest vocals from Young Buck and another Lil Jon-produced hit "Presidential" and production by Scott Storch. Their song "I'mma Shine" was featured in the 2006 film Step Up and on its soundtrack.

YoungBloodZ has made many appearances in a number of hit singles including Cherish's "Do It to It", Sammie's "You Should Be My Girl", both produced by Jazzy Pha. Sean P appeared on the Billboard R&B/Hip-Hop number one song "Snap Yo Fingers" by Lil Jon featuring E-40. YoungBloodz have also been featured in songs with T.I., Nelly, Gucci Mane, Lil Scrappy, Twista, DJ Khaled and T-Pain. The group are working on a new album Back From the Liquor Sto, that is scheduled for release soon. The first official singles from the EP are entitled "Foolish" and "She Drank, She Smoke" both produced by Rawbeatzz.

 Legal issues 
Both members were arrested on June 1, 2006, on drugs and weapons charges in Atlanta after a traffic stop involving a tour bus with an expired license plate. All charges were eventually dropped and subsequently the driver was charged. J-Bo and Sean P never had any trouble with the law before this arrest.

 Discography 

 1999 Against da Grain 2003 Drankin' Patnaz 2005 Ev'rybody Know Me 2006 Still Grippin' tha Grain: The Best Of2007 Hood Anthems 2008 Atl's Finest''

References

External links 
 [ Billboard chart history]

American crunk groups
African-American male rappers
African-American musical groups
American musical duos
Hip hop duos
Musical groups from Georgia (U.S. state)
Southern hip hop groups
Rappers from Atlanta
Musical groups from Atlanta